The Temple tax (lit. מחצית השקל the half shekel) was a tax paid by Israelites and Levites which went towards the upkeep of the Jewish Temple, as reported in the New Testament. Traditionally, Kohanim (Jewish priests) were exempt from the tax.

Hebrew Bible
In later centuries, the half-shekel was adopted as the amount of the Temple tax, although in Nehemiah 10:32–34 the tax is given as a third of a shekel.

A Tyrian shekel contained 13.1g of pure silver; at a spot valuation of US$28/ozt in 2021, worth about $12.

After the return under Nehemiah, Jews in the Diaspora continued to pay the Temple tax. Josephus reported that at the end of the 30s CE "many tens of thousands" of Babylonian Jews guarded the convoy taking the tax to Jerusalem (Ant. 18.313).

New Testament
The tax is mentioned in the Gospel of Matthew in the New Testament, when Jesus and his disciples were in Capernaum. The collectors of the temple tax (didrachma) came to Peter and said "Does your teacher not pay the temple tax?" The narrative, which does not appear in the other gospels, leads to a discussion between Jesus and Peter about payment of the taxes levied by the "kings of the earth", and the miracle according to which Peter finds a stater, in the mouth of a fish, which is used to pay the tax due for both of them. The stater "was reckoned as equal to four drachmæ, and would therefore pay the didrachma both for Peter and his Master".

Although the word "temple" does not appear in this text, the KJV translates it to "Tribute", but it is certainly "the Tax inaugurated by God in the wilderness" in Exodus 30:11–16. In the NET translation the same Greek word (didrachma) is translated first as "Temple Tax" and second as "Double-Drachma" to strongly infer its meaning.

After the destruction of the Temple

The first Roman attempt to halt payments of the tax was made long before The Jewish War on account of customs controls. The Senate had forbidden the export of gold and silver, but the Jews of Italy continued to pay the Temple tax. In 62 BCE L. Valerius Flaccus, governor of the province of Asia, issued an edict forbidding the Jews of his province from sending the tax to Jerusalem. After the destruction of the Temple in Jerusalem in 70 AD, a new Roman tax was imposed on the Jews, the Fiscus Judaicus, which was diverted into imperial coffers.

References

Tabernacle and Temples in Jerusalem
Religious taxation